Shielmartin Hill or Shelmartin ( high) is a peak on Howth Head. From it can be seen Portmarnock, Sutton, Bull Island and the coastal areas behind it, and most of Dublin Bay.

Form
From Sutton Creek, the crest of the hill seems to be cleft in two, but the actual peak is the southern one (i.e. the one to the right in the picture) - the northern one is an ancient cairn, on whose southern edge three or four modern cairns in the form of circles have been built. The original cairn was reputed to be the burial site of Crimhthan Niadhnair.

Access
A sign engraved on a stone slab indicates that the only right of way lies down the northwest side of the hill. Other paths exist, but the one to the northeast is dangerous as it is both extremely steep and overgrown. A route to the southeast is safe, but leads across the golf course.

The hill is surrounded by Howth Golf Course to the west, north and east. To the southwest it is bordered by Carrickbrack Road, from which a path leads up to the top. Private residences lie to the south.

Other peaks
Also adjacent is Dun Hill, while nearby are Muck Rock (Carrickmore) and Carrickbrack.

References

External links
 Satellite broad view of hill
 Satellite view of path from Carrickbrack Road
 Satellite closeup of peak

Howth
Mountains and hills of Fingal